The 1986 Camel GT Championship season was the 16th season of the IMSA GT Championship auto racing series.  It was for GTP and Lights classes of prototypes, as well as Grand Tourer-style racing cars which ran in the GTO and GTU classes.  It began February 1, 1986, and ended October 26, 1986, after eighteen rounds.

Schedule
The GT and Prototype classes did not participate in all events, nor did they race together at shorter events.  Races marked as GT featured both GTO and GTU classes combined, while Proto signifies GTP and Lights running together.  Races marked with All had all classes on track at the same time.

Season results

Notes

References

External links
 World Sports Racing Prototypes - 1986 IMSA GT Championship results

IMSA GT Championship seasons
IMSA GT